Leqiu Township is a township in Nanjian Yi Autonomous County, Yunnan, China.

Administrative division
As of 2018, the town is divided into seven villages: 
 Mijialu
 Dongsheng
 Leqiu
 Mali
 Lianhe
 Shanghu
 Zhujie

History
During the Great Leap Forward, it known as "Leqiu Commune" in 1958. It was incorporated as a township in 1988.

Geography
The township is situated at northwestern Nanjian Yi Autonomous County, bordering Bixi Township to the west, Yongcui Township to the south, Weishan Yi and Hui Autonomous County to the north, and Nanjian Town to the east.

The highest point is the Xinshan Temple, elevation .

Economy
The region's economy is based on agriculture. Significant crops include grain, wheat, and corn. Commercial crops include tobacco, tea, bean, and Juglans sigillata.

Demographics

As of 2020, the National Bureau of Statistics of China estimates the township's population now to be 18,099.

Transportation
The China National Highway G214 passes across the township.

The township is connected to the Dali–Lincang railway.

References

Bibliography

Divisions of Nanjian Yi Autonomous County